The Zvenigorodka uezd was one of the subdivisions of the Kiev Governorate of the Russian Empire. It was situated in the southern part of the governorate. Its administrative centre was Zvenigorodka (Zvenyhorodka).

Demographics
At the time of the Russian Empire Census of 1897, Zvenigorodsky Uyezd had a population of 274,704. Of these, 88.0% spoke Ukrainian, 9.7% Yiddish, 1.4% Russian, 0.6% Polish and 0.1% Romani as their native language.

References

 
Uezds of Kiev Governorate
1796 establishments in the Russian Empire
1923 disestablishments in Ukraine